Don't Make It Easy for Me is the fourth studio album by American country music artist Earl Thomas Conley. It was released in May 16, 1983 via RCA Records. The album includes the singles "Your Love's on the Line", "Holding Her and Loving You", "Don't Make It Easy for Me" and "Angel in Disguise".

Track listing

Chart performance

References

1983 albums
Earl Thomas Conley albums
RCA Records albums